Easy Fly Express is a cargo airline based in Dhaka, Bangladesh, with its main hub at Shahjalal International Airport. The airline was founded in 2007 and commenced operations on 1 July 2008. Its fleet comprises one Saab 340 aircraft.

History
Easy Fly Express was founded on 18 April 2007, and received its first aircraft HS 748 (Reg: S2-AAX) on 7 May 2008. The aircraft was registered on 24 June 2008 and the airline commenced operations on 1 July 2008. In February 2014, Karnaphuli Group purchased 100% of the shares of the airlines. The airline operates domestic and international cargo flights.

The airline has been challenged by Monaco and London-based easyGroup, licensor of the easyJet brand, over its orange "easyFly" branding which is strikingly similar to that used by easyJet.  An April 2019 "Brand Thief"  statement by easyGroup indicated the Airbus A300 in question was no longer operated by Easy Fly Express and had been stripped of the contentious logo.

Fleet

The Easy Fly Express fleet consists of the following aircraft (as of August 2019):

See also
 List of airlines of Bangladesh

References

External links

 Official website

Airlines of Bangladesh
Airlines established in 2007
Bangladeshi companies established in 2007